Wilson is a village in East Feliciana Parish, Louisiana, United States. The population was 595 at the 2010 census, down from 668 in 2000. It is part of the Baton Rouge Metropolitan Statistical Area.

Geography
Louisiana Highway 19 passes through the village, leading north  to Norwood and south  to Baton Rouge.

Demographics

As of the 2020 United States census, there were 348 people, 202 households, and 120 families residing in the village.

References

Villages in Louisiana
Villages in East Feliciana Parish, Louisiana
Baton Rouge metropolitan area